The Lafayette metropolitan area may refer to:

The Lafayette, Louisiana metropolitan area, United States
The Lafayette, Indiana metropolitan area, United States

See also
Lafayette (disambiguation)